Gao Yun may refer to:

Gao Yun (emperor), first emperor of Northern Yan state.
Gao Yun (duke), official of Northern Wei dynasty.